Mrs. Chinnathirai is a 2017–2018 Indian Tamil-language reality show which aired on Star Vijay on every Sunday at 19:00 (IST) starting from 24 September 2017. This show features married female celebrities of the Tamil television industry. Through this show, they will display their talents and skills. The show is hosted by Ma Ka Pa Anand, Kollywood actor Shakthi Vasudevan and Tamil choreographer and actress Gayathri Raguram are the judges of the show.<ref>{{Cite news|url=http://cinema.vikatan.com/tamil-cinema/news/103277-mrschinnathirai-actresses-share-their-experiences-on-show.html|title=ஷக்தியும், காயத்ரியும் எங்களைப் பிரிச்சிட்டாங்க! - அனுபவம் பகிரும் 'மிஸஸ் சின்னத்திரை' நாயகிகள்|publisher=cinema.vikatan.com|access-date=2017-09-26|language=ta}}</ref> The show winner is Sujitha.

Winners
The first season grand finale episode of Mrs. Chinnathirai'' aired on 21 January 2018, Sunday at 4:00PM (IST). The Tamil film actress Radha will be the chief guest with Kings of Comedy Juniors are expected to be a laugh riot.

Overview
The show about will have 9 different rounds including the grand Finale. Each round will have a different theme and a different venue. That one celebrity who is super talented with multi-tasking capabilities will win the Title Mrs. Chinnathirai.

Host
 Ma Ka Pa Anand: who had appeared on Vijay TV in Tamil reality shows on television host like Airtel Super Singer, Athu Ithu Ethu and Kings of Dance. He is also an actor in Tamil movies

Judge
 Shakthi Vasudevan: a Tamil actor best known for playing leading roles in Ninaithale Inikkum and a Bigg Boss Tamil 1 contestant. 
 Gayathri Raguram: an Indian (Tamil) actress and choreographer who has worked in the South Indian film industry like Parasuram, Whistle and Vikadan and a Bigg Boss Tamil 1 contestant.

Celebrities
 Sujitha: who has appeared an actress best known for playing the lead role in Tamil Serial like Maharani (2009-2011), Vilakku Vacha Nerathula (2009-2012), Oru Kai Osai (2014-2015).
 Nisha Krishnan: an anchor and actress best known for playing supporting roles in Tamil Serials like Kana Kanum Kalangal Kallooriyin Kadhai, Valli (TV series) (2013 series), Deivamagal (2013-2014), Office and a lead role like Mahabharatham (2013-2016) and Thalayanai Pookal (2016-2017).
 Sindhu Shyam, an actress, did supporting roles in Malayalam movies like Jeevan Masai and many Tamil TV serials including Pagal Nilavu, Deivamagal.
 Monica, an actress, appeared in Deivam Thantha Veedu serial. She gained major popularity when she was Weather forecast anchor in Sun TV news.
 Vandhana, an actress, played supporting role in Anandham, Ponnunjal, Kalyanam Mudhal Kadhal Varai serials.
 RJ Sindhu, Radio Jockey in Fever FM and also judged Kings of Comedy Juniors.
 Anu Vignesh, an actress who appeared in Mella Thirandhathu Kadhavu serial.
 Sri Vithiya, an actress who played supporting role in Kallikattu Palikoodam and Kalyana Parisu.
 Vanitha, an actress, who is currently playing a supporting role in Deivamagal, Thalaiyanai Pookal and Pagal Nilavu serials. She has also acted in Kalyanam Mudhal Kadhal Varai, Ponnunjal, 
 Sri Durga, an actress, appeared in supporting room in very famous Alaigal and Mundhanai Mudichu.

Team
 Blue Team

 Red Team

List of episodes

Note

During Village Round. Each contestant were given a village based name for the round.

Filming
The first schedule of filming was held in Tamil Nadu and Kerala. The Second schedule of filming was held in Goa (Episode: 13-14) and The Third schedule of filming was held in Thailand at Pattaya and Bangkok (Episode: 15-16). This is the first time in the history of Tamil television show was shot in Thailand.

References

External links
Vijay TV Official Website on Hotstar

Star Vijay original programming
Tamil-language reality television series
Tamil-language game shows
Tamil-language talk shows
Tamil-language quiz shows
2010s Tamil-language television series
2017 Tamil-language television series debuts
Tamil-language television shows
2018 Tamil-language television series endings